Ndi Okereke-Onyiuke (born 2 November 1950) is a former director general of the Nigerian Stock Exchange and the first female stockbroker in Nigeria.

Early life
She had her secondary education at Queen's School, Enugu, Nigeria. She obtained her MBA in Finance and Computer Science from City University of New York, USA. Although Okereke-Onyiuke claimed that she earned a Doctor of Philosophy as well as Doctor of Administration in Finance and Securities Market from Graduate School of the same university, there is no record according to the university that she attended the programme and was awarded the said degrees. Ndi Okereke-Onyiuke started work with the Nigerian Stock Exchange in January 1983 as the Manager and Head of Research and Information Services.

Career
She rose to the apex position of Director General and Chief Executive Officer of the Nigerian Stock Exchange (NSE). Ndi Okereke Onyiuke is one of the notable women in Nigeria who has occupied important and key administrative and political positions. She is the first woman that ever hold the position of Director of NSE.

Ndi Okereke-Onyiuke among others were honored by Professional Excellence Foundation of Nigeria (PEFON) for excellence and leading right in their profession

References

1950 births
Living people
Nigerian stockbrokers
Nigerian women in business
City University of New York alumni
Women stockbrokers